Island Cove may refer to:

 Lower Island Cove, Newfoundland and Labrador, Canada
 Upper Island Cove, Newfoundland and Labrador, Canada

See also

 Cove Island